Edward Hulewicz (22 November 1937 – 4 September 2022) was a Polish singer and composer.

Life and career 
Born in  Berezne, the son of a professional violinist, Hulewicz studied at the Higher School of Pedagogy in Gdańsk and started his career in the mid-1960s with the band , best known for the Hulewicz-penned hit "Siała baba mak". After the breakup of the group, Hulewicz entered another popular band of the time, with whom he also collaborated as a composer and recorded several singles including the hit "Obietnice".

Hulewicz began his solo career in 1971, getting the peak of his fame thanks to the participation in several editions of the Sopot International Song Festival and of the Opole Song Festival, and to hits such as "Za Zdrowie Pań", "Paskuda" and "Bo jedno życie mam". In the 1980s he moved to the US, where he continued performing in Polish-American community clubs and venues, before moving back to Poland in 2005.

During his career Hulewicz received various honours, notably the Medal for Merit to Culture – Gloria Artis.

He died of cancer on 4 September 2022, at the age of 84.

References

External links 
 
  
 

1937 births
2022 deaths 
People from Volhynian Governorate
Polish folk singers
Polish pop singers
Polish male singers
Recipients of the Gold Medal for Merit to Culture – Gloria Artis
Recipients of the Silver Medal for Merit to Culture – Gloria Artis
Recipient of the Meritorious Activist of Culture badge